William D. Catto is a United States Marine Corps major general who is the chief of staff of the United States European Command.  He assumed the post in July 2006, becoming the first U.S. Marine to hold the role.  Catto has served over 10 years in command assignments at the lieutenant colonel, colonel, brigadier general, and major general ranks.

Biography
Catto earned his undergraduate degree from Bethel College and  his M.A. from Webster University.

Following qualification to operate the CH-46 Sea Knight helicopter,  Catto spent the next thirteen years in operational assignments. In squadrons he served in the Aircraft Maintenance, Administration, and Operations Departments. He served with 7th Marines as the Air Officer and then Regimental Operations Officer.

Following Command and Staff College, Catto was assigned to Headquarters Marine Corps in Washington, D.C., where he served in Manpower as the Major's Rotary-Wing Assignment Officer and then as the Administrative Assistant to the Deputy Commandant for Aviation.

Returning to the Operating Forces, Catto was assigned to HMM-163 and served as the executive officer and then commanding officer where he deployed twice in MEU (SOC) rotations. Following this tour, he was assigned to the RAND Corporation in Santa Monica, California, as a Marine Corps Fellow. Following this tour he was again ordered to duty in Washington, D.C., with the Office of the Secretary of Defense; Programs, Analysis, and Evaluations; Cost Analysis Improvement Group; Weapons Systems Cost Analysis Division. Catto then went on to command Marine Aviation Weapons and Tactics Squadron One. In flying assignments, he has amassed more than 4,100 flight hours in 13 aircraft types.

From June 2000 to June 2002, Catto served concurrently as commanding general, Marine Corps Warfighting Laboratory, and vice chief of naval research, Office of Naval Research. From July 2002 to June 2006, he assumed duties as the commanding general, Marine Corps Systems Command.

Catto retired from the Marine Corps in late 2008 and then served as a director for Raytheon. He then retired from Raytheon in the spring of 2018.

Awards
Major General Catto's personal awards include:

See also

Hispanics in the United States Marine Corps

Notes

References
This article incorporates text in the public domain from the United States Marine Corps.

Year of birth missing (living people)
Living people
United States Naval Aviators
Recipients of the Navy Distinguished Service Medal
Recipients of the Legion of Merit
United States Marine Corps generals
Recipients of the Air Medal
Recipients of the Defense Superior Service Medal